The 2018–19 Washington Wizards season was the 58th season of the franchise in the National Basketball Association (NBA) and 46th in the Washington, D.C. area. On March 28, 2019, they were eliminated from playoff contention after the Milwaukee Bucks' victory over the Los Angeles Clippers, missing the playoffs for the first time since 2015-16. This season would also mark the end of the John Wall era in Washington, as he played his last game as a Wizard on December 26, 2018 and would undergo a season-ending surgery on his left heel and then later an Achilles injury from slipping and falling in his home that would cause him to miss the entire 2019-20 season. Wall would get traded to the Houston Rockets for Russell Westbrook and a 2023 first round draft pick following that season. Wall was reunited with his former college teammate DeMarcus Cousins in Houston, both of whom played for the Kentucky Wildcats from 2009-2010. On April 2, the Wizards fired long-standing team president and general manager Ernie Grunfeld, replacing him with longtime assistant Tommy Sheppard.

Background

Off-season
Shortly after the Washington Wizards exited the 2018 NBA Playoffs in late April, General Manager Ernie Grunfeld was quietly granted a two-year extension for his incumbent role with the team. In May, Jason Smith exercised his player option to stay with the team. Jodie Meeks also exercised his player option nearly a month later, despite having to serve the remainder of his 25-game suspension in the 2018-19 NBA season for violating the NBA's Anti-Drug Program in April.

The Wizards made several moves over the summer to overhaul their roster. On June 27th, the team traded their starting center Marcin Gortat to the Los Angeles Clippers for Austin Rivers, as both players were entering the final year of the respective contracts and were growing increasingly disgruntled with their teams. The Wizards then boosted their depth by acquiring veterans Thomas Bryant, Jeff Green and Dwight Howard in free agency. Meanwhile, the team chose not to re-sign five players whose contracts had expired and became unrestricted free agents: Mike Scott, Tim Frazier, Ty Lawson, Chris McCullough, and Ramon Sessions.

Unlike in the previous two years, the Wizards did not trade away their picks in the 2018 NBA draft. Instead, they used the draft to acquire two additional players: Troy Brown Jr., a Freshman from Oregon who traditionally played at Small Forward, was acquired with the Wizards' 15th pick in the first round. Issuf Sanon, a Ukrainian Guard, was selected with the team's 44th pick in the second round. Brown later joined the team, while Sanon was chosen as a "draft-and-stash" player, who would be allowed to continue playing with the professional Slovenian basketball team Olimpija Ljubljana while the Wizards retained his draft rights.

The Wizards rounded out their roster by signing Jordan McRae to a two-way contract, officially adding him to the team in September.

Capital City Go-Go
On August 7, 2018, the Wizards unveiled the new management team behind their first ever NBA G League franchise to be directly affiliated with the team, the Capital City Go-Go, as they were set to play their inaugural season in 2018. Pops Mensah-Bonsu was chosen as the Go-Go's General Manager, and Jarell Christian as their Head Coach. The Go-Go also held open tryouts in September to fill the remaining spots on their roster.

Preseason
The Wizards opened their preseason with an overtime loss to the New York Knicks, 124–121. The game was notable for the combined 83 fouls, resulting in 90 shots, accumulated by both teams over the course of the game. Among those fouls, Markieff Morris was ejected in the second quarter after picking up a second technical foul from a verbal altercation with Knicks rookie Mitchell Robinson.  The Wizards would later go on to win the rest of their matches in the preseason. Meanwhile, Howard stayed out of preseason play entirely, as he dealt with a recurring back injury throughout the preseason, leading to speculation he would miss the team's season opener on October 18.

As the preseason drew to a close, the Wizards made a couple additional personnel changes: On October 15, the team sent Meeks along with a future conditional second-round draft pick to the Milwaukee Bucks in a salary dump, receiving nothing more than the Bucks future conditional second-round draft pick in return. The next day, the team announced that they had hired Washington Mystics player Kristi Toliver as an assistant coach for player development.

October: The Season Begins
The Wizards opened their season at Capital One Arena against the Miami Heat. McRae was called up to fill the empty roster spot left by Meeks' departure, and Ian Mahinmi was tabbed to start in place of Howard, who was still recovering from his injury. The team ended up losing the match 113–112, thanks to a last-second shot by Kelly Olynyk. The following Saturday against the Toronto Raptors, Bradley Beal broke the Wizards' franchise record for all-time three-point shots made, surpassing Gilbert Arenas who previously held the record.

The team finally got their first win of the regular season in a close matchup with the Portland Trail Blazers on October 22, winning 125–124 in overtime thanks to some exceptional three-point shooting from Morris. However, it would be their only win in October, as the team finished the month with a 1–6 record.

November: Roster Shuffling and Howard's Injury
Howard continued to be sidelined from his injury, and the Wizards were approaching a deadline to add another active player to their roster before being penalized by the league. The team decided to sign Chasson Randle, who trained with the team in the preseason and was playing with the Go-Go, to a one-year contract. The team then assigned him back to the Go-Go in time for their season opener.  The Wizards would shuffle him back and forth between the first team roster and the Go-Go before officially waiving him two weeks later.

Howard finally got his first start with the Wizards on November 2, getting 20 points in a loss to the Oklahoma City Thunder. He would go on to start at Center for nine games, leading the team in rebounding for seven of them, including the team's first winning streak between November 10–14. However, Howard's injury returned and forced him to exit the first half of the November 18 game against Portland that the team would eventually lose. Tempers reportedly flared at a team practice as members of the Wizards blamed each other, the coaching staff, and even Grunfeld for their team's woes.

Coach Scott Brooks announced a change to the starting lineup for the next game against the Los Angeles Clippers, recalling Thomas Bryant from the Go-Go shortly after he had been sent down to get playing time and putting him at the starting Center position while Howard continued to recover. He also moved Otto Porter Jr. to the Power Forward slot and put Kelly Oubre Jr. on the starting lineup in the Small Forward position, sending Morris to the bench. The change started off poorly, as the Wizards were down by 24 at one point during the first half, but the team rallied and pulled off a 125–118 victory.

Shortly after the game, the team sent down Brown to the Go-Go, and signed Okaro White to a one-year contract to avoid being penalized after waiving Randle earlier. The team shuffled White back and forth between the main roster and the Go-Go as needed to give him some playing time. Meanwhile, Brooks largely kept to his new starting lineup, sometimes giving Morris more playing time at Center than Bryant even as Bryant would open the game at that position. It was an arrangement that would continue after Howard announced he would be getting spinal surgery to heal his injury, keeping him sidelined for an additional 2–3 months. Despite being healthy enough to play at Center, Mahinmi's poor performance saw him languish on the bench, collecting DNP-CDs for most of November and December.

December: Desperate Trades and Loss of Wall
Despite reports from the previous month that the Wizards were open to any trade offers involving any player on their roster, including their star players, there seemed to be few takers around the league, as even the team's highly skilled players were considered too pricey to touch. However, in December, the team managed to successfully trade away some lower-priced players for relief. On the 7th, the team inserted itself into a three-team trade with the Cavaliers and the Bucks. The team ended up trading away Smith and "cash considerations" to the Bucks and acquired Sam Dekker from the Cavaliers in this trade.

About a week later, the team nearly pulled off another three-team trade involving themselves, the Memphis Grizzlies, and the Phoenix Suns that would see them acquire Trevor Ariza from the Suns in exchange for Austin Rivers, with Oubre going to the Grizzlies for two second round picks. However, the trade fell apart when the Grizzlies did not clarify which of MarShon Brooks or Dillon Brooks would be going to the Suns. Soon after the trade fell through, the Wizards decided to deal with the Suns directly, getting Ariza in exchange for Oubre and Rivers, who was waived by the Suns shortly after the trade was accepted. The Wizards re-signed Randle to the roster from the Go-Go to fill the spot vacated by Rivers after the trade. While the Wizards looked to remain competitive, their playoff contention hopes were dashed on December 29, when it was announced that John Wall was out for the rest of the season due to a chronic Achilles tendon injury relating to Haglund's syndrome.

January/February: Further turmoil and rebuilding trades
In spite of their hardships relating to the team around this time, which included John Wall's first surgery resulting in an infection, throughout the month of January, the Wizards performed fairly well to acquire an 8–6 record for the month without Wall. However, the Wizards were still looking for moves to help rebuild the team for the future while also trying to see if the playoffs were still possible in the Eastern Conference. On February 5, potential plans for their next season were already hindered without John Wall playing, as it was announced that Wall suffered a ruptured left Achilles tendon injury through slipping and falling down in his home. That injury would hinder his playing time for 12 months. alongside his previous injury leaving him out for the rest of this season. A day later, the Wizards also traded one of their highest paid players, Otto Porter Jr., to the Chicago Bulls in exchange for the expiring contracts of Jabari Parker and Bobby Portis, as well as a protected 2023 second round pick. At the NBA trade deadline on February 7, Washington also traded Markieff Morris and a 2021 second round pick to the New Orleans Pelicans for Wesley Johnson.

Draft picks

Roster

Standings

Division

Conference

Game log

Preseason

|- style="background:#fcc;"
| 1
| October 1
| New York
| 
| Kelly Oubre Jr. (15)
| Kelly Oubre Jr. (8)
| Oubre Jr., Randle (4)
| Capital One Arena11,826
| 0–1
|- style="background:#cfc;"
| 2
| October 5
| Miami
| 
| Bradley Beal (20)
| Markieff Morris (10)
| John Wall (9)
| Capital One Arena12,825
| 1–1
|- style="background:#cfc;"
| 3
| October 8
| @ New York
| 
| Bradley Beal (20)
| Porter, Wall, Bryant, Smith (6)
| John Wall (9)
| Madison Square Garden19,763
| 2–1
|- style="background:#cfc;"
| 4
| October 10
| @ Detroit
| 
| John Wall (32)
| Markieff Morris (7)
| John Wall (9)
| Little Caesars Arena9,117
| 3–1
|- style="background:#cfc;"
| 5
| October 12
| Guangzhou Long-Lions
| 
| Devin Robinson (23)
| Troy Brown Jr. (8)
| Austin Rivers (5)
| Capital One Arena10,907
| 4–1

Regular season

|- style="background:#fcc
| 1
| October 18
| Miami
| 
| John Wall (26)
| Otto Porter Jr. (11)
| John Wall (9)
| Capital One Arena20,409
| 0–1
|- style="background:#fcc
| 2
| October 20
| Toronto
| 
| Bradley Beal (32)
| Markieff Morris (7)
| Beal, John Wall (6)
| Capital One Arena16,185
| 0–2
|- style="background:#cfc;"
| 3
| October 22
| @ Portland
| 
| Markieff Morris (28)
| Otto Porter Jr. (10)
| John Wall (9)
| Moda Center19,187
| 1–2
|- style="background:#fcc;"
| 4
| October 24
| @ Golden State
| 
| Bradley Beal (23)
| Morris, Smith, Oubre Jr., Bryant (4)
| John Wall (6)
| Oracle Arena19,596
| 1–3
|- style="background:#fcc;"
| 5
| October 26
| @ Sacramento
| 
| John Wall (26)
| Oubre Jr., Porter Jr. (9)
| John Wall (8)
| Golden 1 Center14,101
| 1–4
|- style="background:#fcc;"
| 6
| October 28
| @ LA Clippers
| 
| Bradley Beal (20)
| Jeff Green (8)
| John Wall (5)
| Staples Center16,491
| 1–5
|- style="background:#fcc;"
| 7
| October 30
| @ Memphis
| 
| John Wall (22)
| Porter Jr., Mahinmi (6)
| Beal, John Wall (7)
| FedExForum14,106
| 1–6

|- style="background:#fcc;"
| 8
| November 2
| Oklahoma City
| 
| Bradley Beal (27)
| Austin Rivers (5)
| John Wall (9)
| Capital One Arena20,409
| 1–7
|- style="background:#cfc;"
| 9
| November 4
| New York
| 
| John Wall (26)
| Dwight Howard (10)
| John Wall (7)
| Capital One Arena16,679
| 2–7
|-style="background:#fcc;"
| 10
| November 6
| @ Dallas
| 
| John Wall (24)
| Dwight Howard (11)
| John Wall (10)
| American Airlines Center19,234
| 2–8
|- style="background:#fcc;"
| 11
| November 9
| @ Orlando
| 
| Bradley Beal (27)
| Dwight Howard (8)
| John Wall (12)
| Amway Center16,562
| 2–9
|- style="background:#cfc;"
| 12
| November 10
| @ Miami
| 
| John Wall (28)
| Dwight Howard (16)
| John Wall (9)
| American Airlines Arena19,600
| 3–9
|- style="background:#cfc;"
| 13
| November 12
| Orlando
| 
| John Wall (25)
| Morris, Howard (8)
| John Wall (10)
| Capital One Arena15,346
| 4–9
|-style="background:#cfc;"
| 14
| November 14
| Cleveland
| 
| Bradley Beal (20)
| Oubre Jr., Howard, Mahinmi (8)
| John Wall (9)
| Capital One Arena14,537
| 5–9
|-style="background:#fcc;"
| 15
| November 16
| Brooklyn
| 
| Dwight Howard (25)
| Dwight Howard (17)
| John Wall (7)
| Capital One Arena15,102
| 5–10
|-style="background:#fcc
| 16
| November 18
| Portland
| 
| John Wall (24)
| Jeff Green (13)
| Tomas Satoransky (7)
| Capital One Arena16,647
| 5–11
|-style="background:#cfc
| 17
| November 20
| LA Clippers
| 
| John Wall (30)
| Otto Porter Jr. (14)
| John Wall (8)
| Capital One Arena14,499
| 6–11
|- style="background:#fcc
| 18
| November 23
| @ Toronto
| 
| Bradley Beal (20)
| Dwight Howard (8)
| John Wall (11)
| Scotiabank Arena19,800
| 6–12
|-style="background:#cfc
| 19
| November 24
| New Orleans
| 
| Otto Porter Jr. (29)
| Markieff Morris (9)
| Wall, Beal (8)
| Capital One Arena15,165
| 7–12
|-style="background:#cfc
| 20
| November 26
| Houston
| 
| John Wall (36)
| Markieff Morris (10)
| John Wall (11)
| Capital One Arena16,872
| 8–12
|- style="background:#fcc;"
| 21
| November 28
| @ New Orleans
| 
| Porter Jr., Morris (22)
| Markieff Morris (9)
| John Wall (11)
| Smoothie King Center13,570
| 8–13
|- style="background:#fcc;"
| 22
| November 30
| @ Philadelphia
| 
| Bradley Beal (19)
| Bryant, Morris (7)
| John Wall (7)
| Wells Fargo Center20,400
| 8–14

|- style="background:#cfc
| 23
| December 1
| Brooklyn
| 
| John Wall (30)
| Otto Porter Jr. (11)
| John Wall (9)
| Capital One Arena15,448
| 9–14
|- style="background:#cfc
| 24
| December 3
| @ New York
| 
| Bradley Beal (27)
| Bradley Beal (8)
| John Wall (15)
| Madison Square Garden19,440
| 10–14
|- style="background:#cfc
| 25
| December 5
| @ Atlanta
| 
| Bradley Beal (36)
| Otto Porter Jr. (11)
| Bradley Beal (9)
| State Farm Arena12,551
| 11–14
|- style="background:#fcc
| 26
| December 8
| @ Cleveland
| 
| Bradley Beal (27)
| Otto Porter Jr. (11)
| John Wall (6)
| Quicken Loans Arena19,432
| 11–15
|- style="background:#fcc
| 27
| December 10
| @ Indiana
| 
| Bradley Beal (30)
| Markieff Morris (7)
| Austin Rivers (4)
| Bankers Life Fieldhouse14,645
| 11–16
|- style="background:#fcc
| 28
| December 12
| Boston
| 
| John Wall (34)
| Jeff Green (10)
| John Wall (13)
| Capital One Arena20,409
| 11–17
|- style="background:#fcc
| 29
| December 14
| @ Brooklyn
| 
| Bradley Beal (31)
| Kelly Oubre Jr. (6)
| John Wall (13)
| Barclays Center13,232
| 11–18
|- style="background:#cfc
| 30
| December 16
| LA Lakers
| 
| John Wall (40)
| Bradley Beal (12)
| John Wall (14)
| Capital One Arena20,409
| 12–18
|- style="background:#fcc
| 31
| December 18
| @ Atlanta
| 
| Bradley Beal (29)
| Bradley Beal (10)
| John Wall (6)
| State Farm Arena16,489
| 12–19
|- style="background:#fcc
| 32
| December 19
| @ Houston
| 
| Bradley Beal (28)
| Trevor Ariza (6)
| John Wall (12)
| Toyota Center18,055
| 12–20
|- style="background:#cfc
| 33
| December 22
| Phoenix
| 
| Bradley Beal (40)
| Thomas Bryant (13)
| Bradley Beal (15)
| Capital One Arena16,571
| 13–20
|- style="background:#fcc
| 34
| December 23
| @ Indiana
| 
| Markieff Morris (16)
| Thomas Bryant (7)
| Wall, Beal (5)
| Bankers Life Fieldhouse17,923
| 13–21
|- style="background:#fcc
| 35
| December 26
| @ Detroit
| 
| Wall, Beal (21)
| John Wall (7)
| John Wall (8)
| Little Caesars Arena17,534
| 13–22
|- style="background:#fcc
| 36
| December 28
| Chicago
| 
| Bradley Beal (34)
| Thomas Bryant (8)
| Bradley Beal (5)
| Capital One Arena20,409
| 13–23
|- style="background:#cfc
| 37
| December 29
| Charlotte
| 
| Trevor Ariza (24)
| Thomas Bryant (10)
| Trevor Ariza (9)
| Capital One Arena17,197
| 14–23

|- style="background:#cfc
| 38
| January 2
| Atlanta
| 
| Bradley Beal (24)
| Thomas Bryant (15)
| Tomas Satoransky (7)
| Capital One Arena15,324
| 15–23
|- style="background:#fcc
| 39
| January 4
| @ Miami
| 
| Bradley Beal (33)
| Bradley Beal (9)
| Bradley Beal (7)
| American Airlines Arena15,324
| 15–24
|- style="background:#cfc
| 40
| January 6
| @ Oklahoma City
| 
| Bradley Beal (25)
| Ian Mahinmi (10)
| Bradley Beal (6)
| Chesapeake Energy Arena18,203
| 16–24
|- style="background:#fcc
| 41
| January 8
| @ Philadelphia
| 
| Bradley Beal (28)
| Trevor Ariza (9)
| Ian Mahinmi (5)
| Wells Fargo Center20,446
| 16–25
|- style="background:#cfc
| 42
| January 9
| Philadelphia
| 
| Bradley Beal (34)
| Ian Mahinmi (8)
| Tomas Satoransky (11)
| Capital One Arena18,039
| 17–25
|- style="background:#cfc
| 43
| January 11
| Milwaukee
| 
| Bradley Beal (32)
| Tomas Satoransky (12)
| Tomas Satoransky (10)
| Capital One Arena17,966
| 18–25
|- style="background:#fcc
| 44
| January 13
| Toronto
| 
| Bradley Beal (43)
| Thomas Bryant (11)
| Bradley Beal (15)
| Capital One Arena16,919
| 18–26
|- style="background:#cfc;"
| 45
| January 17
| New York
| 
| Bradley Beal (26)
| Otto Porter Jr. (11)
| Trevor Ariza (7)
| The O2 Arena19,078
| 19–26
|- style="background:#cfc;"
| 46
| January 21
| Detroit
| 
| Trevor Ariza (20)
| Bryant, Ariza (12)
| Tomas Satoransky (8)
| Capital One Arena16,229
| 20–26
|- style="background:#fcc;"
| 47
| January 24
| Golden State
| 
| Trevor Ariza (27)
| Bradley Beal (10)
| Tomas Satoransky (10)
| Capital One Arena20,409
| 20–27
|- style="background:#cfc;"
| 48
| January 25
| @ Orlando
| 
| Bradley Beal (27)
| Trevor Ariza (7)
| Tomas Satoransky (8)
| Amway Center17,216
| 21–27
|- style="background:#fcc;"
| 49
| January 27
| @ San Antonio
| 
| Beal, Satoransky (21)
| Thomas Bryant (10)
| Tomas Satoransky (8)
| AT&T Center18,354
| 21–28
|- style="background:#fcc;"
| 50
| January 29
| @ Cleveland
| 
| Bradley Beal (31)
| Thomas Bryant (8)
| Beal, Satoransky (7)
| Quicken Loans Arena19,432
| 21–29
|- style="background:#cfc;"
| 51
| January 30
| Indiana
| 
| Bradley Beal (25)
| Sam Dekker (9)
| Beal, Satoransky, Green (6)
| Capital One Arena15,354
| 22–29

|- style="background:#fcc
| 52
| February 2
| Milwaukee
| 
| Bradley Beal (24)
| Sam Dekker (8)
| Tomas Satoransky (6)
| Capital One Arena20,409
| 22–30
|- style="background:#fcc
| 53
| February 4
| Atlanta
| 
| Bradley Beal (27)
| Otto Porter Jr. (8)
| Tomas Satoransky (9)
| Capital One Arena15,025
| 22–31
|- style="background:#fcc
| 54
| February 6
| @ Milwaukee
| 
| Bradley Beal (30)
| Thomas Bryant (14)
| Tomas Satoransky (10)
| Fiserv Forum17,360
| 22–32
|- style="background:#cfc
| 55
| February 8
| Cleveland
| 
| Bobby Portis (30)
| Jabari Parker (11)
| Bradley Beal (13)
| Capital One Arena16,682
| 23–32
|- style="background:#cfc
| 56
| February 9
| @ Chicago
| 
| Bradley Beal (31)
| Bobby Portis (12)
| Tomas Satoransky (11)
| United Center19,942
| 24–32
|- style="background:#fcc
| 57
| February 11
| @ Detroit
| 
| Bradley Beal (32)
| Thomas Bryant (8)
| Bradley Beal (10)
| Little Caesars Arena15,246
| 24–33
|- style="background:#fcc
| 58
| February 13
| @ Toronto
| 
| Bradley Beal (28)
| Jabari Parker (9)
| Bradley Beal (11)
| Scotiabank Arena19,800
| 24–34
|- style="background:#fcc
| 59
| February 22
| @ Charlotte
| 
| Bradley Beal (46)
| Bobby Portis (12)
| Bradley Beal (7)
| Spectrum Center15,572
| 24–35
|- style="background:#fcc
| 60
| February 23
| Indiana
| 
| Bradley Beal (35)
| Thomas Bryant (12)
| Trevor Ariza (7)
| Capital One Arena19,648
| 24–36
|- style="background:#cfc
| 61
| February 27
| @ Brooklyn
| 
| Trevor Ariza (23)
| Bobby Portis (12)
| Tomas Satoransky (10)
| Barclays Center13,683
| 25–36

|- style="background:#fcc
| 62
| March 1
| @ Boston
| 
| Bradley Beal (29)
| Beal, Portis (11)
| Bradley Beal (6)
| TD Garden18,624
| 25–37
|- style="background:#cfc
| 63
| March 3
| Minnesota
| 
| Bobby Portis (26)
| Bobby Portis (12)
| Bradley Beal (8)
| Capital One Arena17,869
| 26–37
|- style="background:#cfc
| 64
| March 6
| Dallas
| 
| Bradley Beal (30)
| Jabari Parker (9)
| Tomas Satoransky (11)
| Capital One Arena16,867
| 27–37
|- style="background:#fcc
| 65
| March 8
| @ Charlotte
| 
| Bradley Beal (15)
| Satoransky, Portis (9)
| Bradley Beal (7)
| Spectrum Center18,144
| 27–38
|- style="background:#fcc
| 66
| March 9
| @ Minnesota
| 
| Bradley Beal (36)
| Bobby Portis (12)
| Tomas Satoransky (11)
| Target Center14,381
| 27–39
|- style="background:#cfc
| 67
| March 11
| Sacramento
| 
| Bradley Beal (27)
| Bobby Portis (13)
| Bradley Beal (9)
| Capital One Arena15,012
| 28–39
|- style="background:#cfc
| 68
| March 13
| Orlando
| 
| Bradley Beal (23)
| Thomas Bryant (10)
| Beal, Satoransky (7)
| Capital One Arena15,107
| 29–39
|- style="background:#fcc
| 69
| March 15
| Charlotte
| 
| Bradley Beal (40)
| Jabari Parker (11)
| Beal, Ariza (5)
| Capital One Arena19,520
| 29–40
|- style="background:#cfc
| 70
| March 16
| Memphis
| 
| Bradley Beal (40)
| Jabari Parker (11)
| Beal, Satoransky (7)
| Capital One Arena19,750
| 30–40
|- style="background:#fcc
| 71
| March 18
| Utah
| 
| Jabari Parker (19)
| Jabari Parker (7)
| Tomas Satoransky (6)
| Capital One Arena15,637
| 30–41
|- style="background:#fcc
| 72
| March 20
| @ Chicago
| 
| Bradley Beal (27)
| Troy Brown Jr. (10)
| Beal, Satoransky (7)
| United Center19,470
| 30–42
|- style="background:#fcc
| 73
| March 21
| Denver
| 
| Bradley Beal (25)
| Parker, Bryant, Portis (8)
| Tomas Satoransky (10)
| Capital One Arena15,986
| 30–43
|- style="background:#fcc
| 74
| March 23
| Miami
| 
| Jeff Green (25)
| Bryant, Portis (11)
| Tomas Satoransky (8)
| Capital One Arena20,409
| 30–44
|- style="background:#fcc
| 75
| March 26
| @ LA Lakers
| 
| Bradley Beal (32)
| Bobby Portis (7)
| Tomas Satoransky (11)
| Staples Center18,997
| 30–45
|- style="background:#cfc
| 76
| March 27
| @ Phoenix
| 
| Bradley Beal (28)
| Thomas Bryant (19)
| Bradley Beal (4)
| Talking Stick Resort Arena16,004
| 31–45
|- style="background:#fcc
| 77
| March 29
| @ Utah
| 
| Bradley Beal (34)
| Bobby Portis (13)
| Tomas Satoransky (9)
| Vivint Smart Home Arena18,306
| 31–46
|- style="background:#cfc
| 78
| March 31
| @ Denver
| 
| Troy Brown Jr. (24)
| Thomas Bryant (14)
| Jordan McRae (7)
| Pepsi Center17,356
| 32–46

|- style="background:#fcc
| 79
| April 3
| Chicago
| 
| Portis, Bryant (14)
| Thomas Bryant (12)
| McRae, Bryant (5)
| Capital One Arena16,616
| 32–47
|- style="background:#fcc
| 80
| April 5
| San Antonio
| 
| Bradley Beal (25)
| Bobby Portis (9)
| Bradley Beal (5)
| Capital One Arena20,409
| 32–48
|- style="background:#fcc
| 81
| April 7
| @ N. Y. Knicks
| 
| Jeff Green (19)
| Bobby Portis (10)
| Tomas Satoransky (7)
| Madison Square Garden19,812
| 32–49
|- style="background:#fcc
| 82
| April 9
| Boston
| 
| Tomas Satoransky (19)
| Ian Mahinmi (12)
| Tomas Satoransky (5)
| Capital One Arena20,409
| 32–50

Player statistics

|-
| align="left"|≠ || align="center"| SF
| 43 || 43 || 1,465 || 226 || 165 || 53 || 13 || 605
|-
| align="left"|‡ || align="center"| SG
| 4 || 0 || 45 || 4 || 2 || 1 || 1 || 0
|-
| align="left"| || align="center"| SG
| style=";"|82 || style=";"|82 || style=";"|3,028 || 411 || style=";"|448 || style=";"|121 || 58 || style=";"|2,099
|-
| align="left"| || align="center"| SF
| 52 || 10 || 730 || 145 || 80 || 21 || 5 || 248
|-
| align="left"| || align="center"| C
| 72 || 53 || 1,496 || style=";"|454 || 92 || 25 || style=";"|67 || 758
|-
| align="left"|≠ || align="center"| PF
| 38 || 0 || 619 || 115 || 37 || 27 || 7 || 230
|-
| align="left"| || align="center"| PF
| 77 || 44 || 2,097 || 309 || 137 || 43 || 39 || 946
|-
| align="left"| || align="center"| C
| 9 || 9 || 230 || 83 || 4 || 7 || 4 || 115
|-
| align="left"|≠ || align="center"| SG
| 4 || 0 || 14 || 1 || 1 || 0 || 0 || 6
|-
| align="left"|≠ || align="center"| SF
| 12 || 0 || 157 || 18 || 7 || 2 || 5 || 33
|-
| align="left"| || align="center"| C
| 34 || 6 || 498 || 128 || 25 || 25 || 16 || 139
|-
| align="left"| || align="center"| SG
| 27 || 0 || 333 || 40 || 30 || 13 || 7 || 160
|-
| align="left"|† || align="center"| PF
| 34 || 15 || 883 || 174 || 60 || 25 || 20 || 391
|-
| align="left"|† || align="center"| SF
| 29 || 7 || 755 || 129 || 20 || 27 || 20 || 373
|-
| align="left"|≠ || align="center"| PF
| 25 || 0 || 682 || 180 || 68 || 23 || 16 || 374
|-
| align="left"|≠ || align="center"| PG
| 3 || 0 || 16 || 2 || 4 || 3 || 1 || 11
|-
| align="left"|† || align="center"| SF
| 41 || 28 || 1,191 || 231 || 80 || 64 || 22 || 518
|-
| align="left"|≠ || align="center"| PF
| 28 || 22 || 768 || 242 || 43 || 24 || 12 || 400
|-
| align="left"|‡ || align="center"| PG
| 49 || 2 || 743 || 56 || 97 || 25 || 3 || 271
|-
| align="left"|† || align="center"| SG
| 29 || 2 || 683 || 71 || 58 || 18 || 10 || 210
|-
| align="left"| || align="center"| SF
| 7 || 0 || 95 || 20 || 6 || 4 || 6 || 47
|-
| align="left"| || align="center"| PG
| 80 || 54 || 2,164 || 279 || 399 || 82 || 13 || 709
|-
| align="left"|† || align="center"| C
| 12 || 1 || 130 || 37 || 12 || 1 || 5 || 44
|-
| align="left"| || align="center"| PG
| 32 || 32 || 1,104 || 116 || 279 || 49 || 29 || 663
|-
| align="left"|‡ || align="center"| PF
| 3 || 0 || 6 || 2 || 0 || 0 || 0 || 0
|}
After all games.
‡Waived during the season
†Traded during the season
≠Acquired during the season

Transactions

Trades

Free Agents

Additions

Subtractions

References

Washington Wizards seasons
Washington Wizards
Washington Wizards
Washington Wizards